Herpetoreas burbrinki, or Burbrink’s keelback, is a species of natricine snake endemic to China.

References

burbrinki
Reptiles of China
Endemic fauna of China
Reptiles described in 2014